Saint-André-sur-Sèvre is a commune located northwest of the Deux-Sèvres department, in western France.

Geography 
This territory is called « Gâtine », and close to the limits of the Vendée in the « High-Bocage » Vendée.

The elevation ranges from 146 meters to 212 meters on the granite massif of the municipality, the average elevation is 179 meters.

The municipality's municipal area covers 1,985 hectares.

History

Hundred Years' War 
The conflict between the Plantagenets and the Capetians, which opposed the English and the French, partly took place in Poitou, Normandy and Aquitaine.

War in the Vendée 
In 1793, during the war in the Vendée: passage of the Infernal Columns to the castle of Saint-Mesmin; a courier from Parthenay announces that the enemy, the Republicans nicknamed the blues, surrounds Chataignieraie, then this army of the revolution seizes Reaumur, Montournay, Mouilleron, Chavaigne, Tillais and Saint-Mesmin.

Places and monuments 
 Castle of Saint-Mesmin at the foot of which flows the river the Sevreau, less than 2 kilometers (1,2 miles) from Saint-Mesmin, is located on the town of Saint-André-sur-Sèvre. It is an old medieval fortress of the 13th century, equipped with a dungeon 28 meters high, built in the 15th century. The castle is open to the public in summer and medieval events are organized.
 A Cloister garden, the river Sevre, a church of the thirteenth century.

See also
Communes of the Deux-Sèvres department

References

External links 
 Castle of Saint-Mesmin

Communes of Deux-Sèvres